Trevarton Charles Sholl (7 July 1845 – March 1867) was an explorer of North-West Australia and government official. During the 1860s, he undertook expeditions to the regions known later as the Kimberley and Pilbara. In March 1867, at the age of 21, Sholl was lost at sea and presumed dead, when the schooner Emma disappeared, during a storm.

Sholl was born in Bunbury and was the son of R. J. (Robert) Sholl (1819–1886) – prominent as a government official, magistrate and explorer. Trevarton Sholl's siblings included R. A. (Richard) Sholl (1847–1919), later Postmaster General of Western Australia and the entrepreneurs and politicians R. F. (Robert) Sholl (1848–1909) and Horace Sholl (1852–1927).
  
In 1865, while working as a government clerk under his father – who was Government Resident for the North District of Western Australia – Trevarton Sholl accompanied Alexander McRae on an expedition to the Glenelg River area. During this period he named the Berckelman River after his mother, Mary Ann Sholl, née Berckelman (1822–1889). Later in 1865, the Government Resident's camp was relocated from the short-lived Camden Harbour settlement to Mount Welcome (which became the basis of the town of Roebourne).

During an 1866 expedition with Charles Broadhurst, Sholl searched for pasture and natural harbours in the area around Exmouth Gulf.

Memorials
 Mount Trevarton (Swedish Wikipedia: :sv:Mount Trevarton), near the Ashburton River. 
 Trevarton Creek, in Karijini National Park.
 Until 1894, Loftus Street in West Perth and Subiaco, was known as Trevarton Street.

See also
List of people who disappeared mysteriously at sea

References 
 G. C. Bolton, 1988, "Sholl, Robert Frederick (1848–1909)", Australian Dictionary of Biography.
 Ian M. Crawford, 2001, We Won the Victory: Aborigines and Outsiders on the North-west Coast of the Kimberley, Fremantle, WA; Fremantle Arts Centre Press.
 Kay Forrest, 1996, The Challenge and the Chance: The Colonisation and Settlement of North West Australia 1861–1914. Carlisle, WA; Hesperian Press.
 H. A. Willis, 1997, "The colour of blood", Eureka Street, vol, 7, no. 1 (Jan-Feb), pp. 20–25.
 Western Australian Museum, n.d., Shipwreck Database, "Emma 1867/03 Coral Bay".

1845 births
1860s missing person cases
1867 deaths
Explorers of Western Australia
People from Bunbury, Western Australia
People from the Pilbara
People lost at sea